Falcatodon ("curved tooth") is an extinct genus of hyainailourid hyaenodonts of the polyphyletic tribe Hyainailourini within paraphyletic subfamily Hyainailourinae, from the Early Oligocene (Rupelian) of the Faiyum Oasis depression in Egypt.

Description
Morales and Pickford (2017, p. 344) diagnose Falcatodon as follows: "Medium sized Hyainailourinae, differing from Metapterodon by the reduction of the protocone in the upper molars (M1 – M2), which is located in a very anterior position. It differs from Hyainailouros by the more sectorial morphology of the upper molars, with more advanced fusion of the paracone-metacone with, nevertheless, a groove separating the cusps visible in the M1. Lower molars sectorial with reduced talonid and without a metaconid. It differs from Isohyaenodon, Sectisodon and Exiguodon, by the lesser reduction of the protocone in the upper molars which, above all, retain a stretched out subtriangular occlusal outline."

Classification and phylogeny

Taxonomy
Falcatodon was originally described as a new species of Metapterodon, M. schlosseri by Holroyd (1999), who nonetheless recognized that Eocene and Oligocene hyainailourids he assigned to Metapterodon might prove generically distinct. Subsequent study demonstrated that Falcatodon is not only distinct from Metapterodon but also closely related to Isohyaenodon.

Phylogeny
The phylogenetic relationships of genus Falcatodon are shown in the following cladogram:

See also
 Mammal classification
 Hyainailourini

References

Hyaenodonts
Oligocene mammals of Africa
Fossil taxa described in 2017
Prehistoric placental genera